Péter Orosz (born 19 August 1981) is a football striker from Hungary.

Career
He has previously played for Fußballclub Wacker Innsbruck in Austria, in Greece for OFI Crete and for French club AC Ajaccio.

Notes

1981 births
Living people
Hungarian footballers
Association football forwards
Hungary international footballers
III. Kerületi TUE footballers
Hungarian expatriate footballers
Expatriate footballers in Austria
FC Red Bull Salzburg players
Hungarian expatriate sportspeople in Austria
FC Wacker Innsbruck (2002) players
Expatriate footballers in Greece
OFI Crete F.C. players
Hungarian expatriate sportspeople in Greece
Vasas SC players
Lombard-Pápa TFC footballers
Austrian Football Bundesliga players
Footballers from Budapest